The Journal of Medical Entomology is a peer-review bimonthly scientific journal published by Oxford University Press for the Entomological Society of America. The journal publishes reports on all aspects of medical entomology and medical acarology. According to the Journal Citation Reports the journal has a 2014 impact factor of 1.953.

References

External links 
 

Publications established in 1964
Entomology journals and magazines
Bimonthly journals
English-language journals
Academic journals published by learned and professional societies of the United States
Oxford University Press academic journals
Entomological Society of America academic journals